The Coral Gables Open Invitational was a golf tournament on the PGA Tour from 1931 to 1937 and 1959 to 1962. It was played at what is now the Miami Biltmore Golf Course in Coral Gables, Florida. It was also known as the Miami Biltmore Open in the 1930s.

Winners

External links
Miami Biltmore golf course website

Former PGA Tour events
Golf in Florida
Sports in Coral Gables, Florida
1931 establishments in Florida
1962 disestablishments in Florida